Center Joint Unified School District (CJUSD) is a  school district, located at the northern edge of Sacramento County, California, in the town of Antelope. There are two high schools (Center High School and McClellan High School), one middle school (Wilson Riles Middle School), and four elementary schools (Dudley Elementary, North Country Elementary, Oak Hill Elementary, and Spinelli Elementary),.

Center High, the primary high school for the district (McClellan is designated as an alternative school, intended to help at-risk students graduate) was recently ranked the third-best public school in the state. Its student publications program, which includes the Blue & Gold newspaper, and The Epic yearbook, has won many different varieties of awards., top-10 rankings in every year between 1996 and 2011 (except 2004). They went to full-color in 2009–2011.

The current superintendent of Center Unified School District is Mr. Scott Loehr.

In 2003 Center USD gave territory to Roseville Joint Union High School District and Dry Creek Joint Elementary School District.

References

External links

School districts in Sacramento County, California